Stagecoach is a 1986 American made-for-television Western action drama film and remake of the classic 1939 film Stagecoach, directed by Ted Post and starring Kris Kristofferson as the Ringo Kid, the role originally played by John Wayne. Willie Nelson portrays famous gunslinger and dentist Doc Holliday, Johnny Cash portrays Marshal Curly Wilcox and Waylon Jennings plays the gambler Hatfield. The four main stars of the film (Nelson, Kristofferson, Cash and Jennings) were associated as members of the country music supergroup The Highwaymen. The supporting cast features Elizabeth Ashley, Anthony Newley, Tony Franciosa, Mary Crosby, June Carter Cash and Jessi Colter.

Plot
In 1880, a group of strangers boards the east-bound stagecoach from Tonto, Arizona Territory, to Lordsburg, New Mexico Territory. The travelers seem ordinary, but many have secrets from which they are running. Among them are Dallas, a prostitute, who is being driven out of town; an alcoholic dentist, Doc Holliday; pregnant Lucy Mallory, who is meeting her cavalry officer husband; and whiskey salesman Trevor Peacock. As the stage sets out, U.S. Cavalry Lieutenant Blanchard announces that Geronimo and his Apaches are on the warpath; his small troop will provide an escort to Dry Fork.

Cast
 Willie Nelson as Doc Holliday
 Kris Kristofferson as Ringo / Ringo Kid / Bill Williams
 Johnny Cash as Marshal Curly Wilcox
 Waylon Jennings as Hatfield (Gambler)
 John Schneider as Buck (Overland Stage Driver)
 Elizabeth Ashley as Dallas
 Anthony Newley as Trevor Peacock (Old John's Whiskey Salesman)
 Tony Franciosa as Henry Gatewood (Tonto Banker)
 Merritt Butrick as Lieutenant Blanchard
 Mary Crosby as Mrs. Lucy Mallory
 June Carter Cash as Mrs. Pickett
 Jessi Colter as Martha

Production

Writing
The plot is roughly based on that of the original film, but some character changes were made:
 The "Doc" character is Doc Boone, M.D., in the original, but is Doc Holliday - a dentist - in the remake.
 In the original, Peacock, the whiskey salesman, travels all the way to Lordsburg, but leaves the coach at the first stop in the remake.
 Hatfield, the gambler, is killed in the original, but in the remake, he survives.
 Gatewood, the banker, survives in the original, but is killed in the remake.
 Ringo deals with Luke Plummer alone in the original; in the remake, he is assisted by the marshal, Hatfield, and Doc.
 Ringo is still technically a jail-breaking criminal when the marshal allows him to escape in the original, but his innocence has been proven when Luke Plummer asks the marshal, "How'd they find out he didn't do it?" in the remake.

Awards and nominations

Won
 Western Heritage Awards 1987: Bronze Wrangler for Fictional Television Drama
 Raymond Katz (executive producer) 
 Willie Nelson (executive producer/actor) 
 Waylon Jennings (actor) 
 Kris Kristofferson (actor) 
 Johnny Cash (actor) 
 Elizabeth Ashley (actress)

Nominated
 American Cinema Editors, USA 1987 for Best Edited Television Special
 Geoffrey Rowland

External links
 Stagecoach (1986 film) at the Internet Movie Database
 
 

1986 television films
1986 films
1986 Western (genre) films
Remakes of American films
Films directed by Ted Post
American Western (genre) television films
United States Marshals Service in fiction
Films set in 1880
Cultural depictions of Doc Holliday
CBS network films
1980s English-language films